The 2020–21 SMU Mustangs men's basketball team represented Southern Methodist University during the 2020–21 NCAA Division I men's basketball season. The Mustangs are led by fifth-year head coach Tim Jankovich and play their home games at Moody Coliseum on their campus in University Park, Texas as members of the American Athletic Conference. They finished the season 11-6, 7-4 to finish in 4th place. They lost in the quarterfinals of the AAC Tournament to Cincinnati. They received an invitation to the NIT where they lost in the first round to Boise State.

Previous season
The Mustangs finished the 2019–20 season 19–11, 9–9 in AAC play to finish in seventh place. They entered as the No. 7 seed in the AAC tournament, which was ultimately cancelled due to the COVID-19 pandemic.

Offseason

Departures

Incoming Transfers

2020 recruiting class
SMU did not sign any recruits for the 2020 class.

2021 recruiting class

Preseason

AAC preseason media poll

On October 28, The American released the preseason Poll and other preseason awards

Preseason Awards
 All-AAC First Team - Kendric Davis
 All-AAC Second Team - Tyson Jolly

Roster

Preseason: Tyson Jolly decided to opt-out for the season.
Jan 23, 2021: Tyson Jolly decided to rejoin the team for the remainder of the season.

Schedule and results
The Mustangs will begin a series with Dayton in Dayton, Ohio beginning in the 2020–2021 season.

COVID-19 impact

Due to the ongoing COVID-19 pandemic, the Mustangs' schedule is subject to change, including the cancellation or postponement of individual games, the cancellation of the entire season, or games played either with minimal fans or without fans in attendance and just essential personnel.

Two previously scheduled games were postponed (vs. Arizona State and @ UNLV) were postponed to the 2021–22 season.
The game @ South Florida scheduled for February 20 was moved to Dallas.

Schedule

|-
!colspan=12 style=| Regular season

|-
!colspan=12 style=| AAC tournament
|-

|-
!colspan=12 style=| NIT
|-

Awards and honors

American Athletic Conference honors

All-AAC First Team
Kendric Davis

All-AAC Third Team
Feron Hunt

Source

References

SMU Mustangs men's basketball seasons
Smu
Smu